Lady Bonython may refer to:
1898–1924: Mary Louisa Fredericka Balthasar (?–1924) (aka Marie Louise Friedrike and Marie Louise Frederica), wife of Sir John Langdon Bonython 
1935–1977: Constance Jean Warren (1891–1977), wife of Sir John Lavington Bonython

See also
Although not titled "Lady Bonython", female Bonythons with knighted husbands included:
1936–?: Mary Elsie Bonython (1874-?), wife of Sir (Herbert) Angas Parsons
1966–2008:Elizabeth (Betty) Hornabrook Bonython CBE (1907–2008), wife of Sir Keith Wilson   

Bonython family